Equestrian events were held at the 1994 Asian Games in Hiroshima Institute of Technology, Hiroshima, Japan, from 3 to 9 October 1994. There were two equestrian disciplines: dressage and jumping. Both disciplines were further divided into individual and team contests for a total of four events.

Medalists

Medal table

References 
 New Straits Times, October 3–10, 1994
 Results

External links 
 Olympic Council of Asia

 
1994 Asian Games events
1994
Asian Games
1994 Asian Games